Tetete's tree frog (Boana tetete) is a frog in the family Hylidae.  It is endemic to Ecuador, Peru and Colombia.  Scientists have seen it between 180 and 420 meters above sea level.

This frog is nocturnal.  It has been observed resting on plants a few feet above flooded areas.  It has large eyes and discs on its toes for climbing.  For a South American tree frog, it is medium-sized.

This frog is a sister species to Boana alfaroi.  It is named after the Teteté people, a group of indigenous people who lived in the Amazon until about 1970.

References

tetete
Frogs of South America
Amphibians of Colombia
Amphibians of Ecuador
Amphibians of Peru
Amphibians described in 2014